Jochen Behle (born 7 July 1960 in Korbach, Hesse) is a former (West) German cross-country skier who competed from 1980 to 1998.

Competing in six Winter Olympics, he earned his best career finish of fourth in the 4 × 10 km relay at Lillehammer in 1994 and his best individual finish of 11th in the 10 km event at those same games.

Behle's best finish at the FIS Nordic World Ski Championships was fifth in the 10 km event at Falun in 1993. His only World Cup victory was in a 50 km event in Canada in 1989.

In West Germany, the phrase "Wo ist Behle?" ("Where is Behle?") became famous when during a TV broadcast of the 1980 Olympic Games in Lake Placid, the commentator couldn't find Behle and worriedly repeated this question.

Cross-country skiing results
All results are sourced from the International Ski Federation (FIS).

Olympic Games

World Championships

World Cup

Season standings

Individual podiums
1 victory 
5 podiums

References

External links

Olympic 4 x 10 km relay results: 1936-2002 

1960 births
Living people
People from Korbach
Sportspeople from Kassel (region)
Cross-country skiers at the 1980 Winter Olympics
Cross-country skiers at the 1984 Winter Olympics
Cross-country skiers at the 1988 Winter Olympics
Cross-country skiers at the 1992 Winter Olympics
Cross-country skiers at the 1994 Winter Olympics
Cross-country skiers at the 1998 Winter Olympics
German male cross-country skiers
Olympic cross-country skiers of Germany
Olympic cross-country skiers of West Germany